WZCK-LD, virtual channel 8 (UHF digital channel 24), is a low-powered television station affiliate with the OnTV4U. licensed to Madison, Wisconsin, United States and serving the Madison television market. The station is owned and operated by DTV America Corporation. WZCK also carries a slate of digital networks on its sub-channels.

History
WZCK was originally known as W08CK, and broadcast a low-power analog television signal on channel 8. The station was owned by the Science of Identity Foundation, a new religious movement with Hindu roots, and broadcast music, some religious programming, and a station ID from a transmitter atop the Tenney Building near the Wisconsin State Capitol and a signal only strong enough to cover the central Madison Isthmus and the UW campus. Though it was off the air for most of the 2010s, W08CK was for a time the only station in Madison to broadcast on the VHF band (CBS affiliate WISC-TV left analog channel 3 for digital channel 50 in the 2009 digital TV transition; Fox affiliate WMSN-TV (channel 47) would relocate its physical digital signal from 11 to 49 earlier in the 2010s).

By 2016, W08CK would be acquired by DTV America, an owner/operator of LPTV stations throughout the U.S.  With the silent station rechristened WZCK-LD, DTV America proceed to construct a digital signal on physical channel 36 at the WKOW studio/transmitter link tower on the west side of Madison. On November 16, 2016, WZCK began digital broadcasting. In August 2022 the COZI affiliation in the Madison market transitioned to a sub-channel of Ion affiliate WIFS, leaving WZCK carrying the OnTV4u infomercial network, a move DTV America has historically used on WZCK between affiliation agreements. OnTV4u is also carried on sister channel W23BW.

Digital channels
The station's digital signal is multiplexed:

See also
List of television stations in Wisconsin

References

External links

Cozi TV affiliates
GetTV affiliates
Quest (American TV network) affiliates
Television channels and stations established in 1992
1992 establishments in Wisconsin
ZCK-LD